Theodosis Theodosiadis (born 23 May 1975) is a Greek professional football manager and former player.

Career
Born in Edessa, Greece, Theodosiadis began playing football for Naoussa F.C. in 1992. He played for Trikala F.C. in the Delta Ethniki.  In the 2008-2009 season, he played for Panetolikos and was crucial, as a starting central defender, in their bid for promotion from the third Greek division to the second Greek division.

Theodosiadis has also previously played for AEL and Levadiakos F.C. in the Greek Super League.

After retiring he started managing Anagennisi Karditsa in 2012.

References

External links
Profile at Onsports.gr

1975 births
Living people
Greek footballers
Panetolikos F.C. players
Trikala F.C. players
Athlitiki Enosi Larissa F.C. players
Levadiakos F.C. players
Anagennisi Karditsa F.C. players
Association football defenders
Footballers from Edessa, Greece
Greek football managers
Anagennisi Karditsa F.C. managers
A.E. Sparta P.A.E. managers
Veria NFC managers
Kalamata F.C. managers